Aben may refer to:

 Aben Humeya (1520–1569), Spanish leader who commanded the Morisco Revolt against Philip II of Spain 
 Aben Kandel (1897–1993), American screenwriter, novelist, and boxer
 Karl Aben (1896–1976), Estonian-Latvian linguist and translator
 Aben, Louisiana, an unincorporated community in Ascension Parish, Louisiana

See also
 Abens, a river in Bavaria, Germany
 Abbán, an Irish saint